Garner Magnet High School (GMHS) is a comprehensive public high school in Garner, North Carolina, United States, a city southeast of Raleigh. The school was founded as Garner Senior High School (GSHS), which graduated its first class in 1969. Garner is one of four high schools in the Wake County Public School System offering an International Baccalaureate Programme of study, along with Needham B. Broughton High School, William G. Enloe High School, and Millbrook High School.

As of 2018-19, Garner offers its nearly 2,400 students 34 IB Diploma Programme courses, 16 Advanced Placement courses, 48 Career and Technical Education courses, Three world languages, a Public Safety Career Academy, an Army JROTC program, courses in Music, Dance, Theatre and Visual Arts, 19 varsity sports, and 50 student clubs. The school is also seeking authorization to begin offering the International Baccalaureate Career-related Programme beginning in the fall of 2019.

History
The school opened in the fall of 1968 when Garner desegregated its schools. Garner Consolidated School had served African-American students. Garner High School had served white students (and handful of African-American students) who elected to attend under the "choice" plan that was in place prior to desegregation. Garner resident Tim Stevens, a retired journalist, in March 2018 premiered a theatrical production, "68," telling the story of the school's September 2 opening that year. Stevens credits the community and principal Wayne Bare for managing integration peacefully and for overcoming a number of construction delays. In a 2008 book on implementation of the Supreme Court's Brown v. Board of Education decision, editors Daugherity and Bolton attribute Garner's successful desegregation to Bare's effort to create a shared culture and avoid a power imbalance. 

In the summer of 2016, the Garner Magnet High School building was partially torn down due to mold and mildew, and Garner Magnet High School's students were located in the South Garner High School building until the renovation of Garner Magnet High School was complete.

Notable alumni
Brandon Banks, former NFL player for the Washington Redskins and CFL player for the Hamilton Tiger-Cats
Anthony Blaylock, former NFL defensive back
Matthew Butler, NFL defensive tackle
Chris Culliver, former NFL defensive back
Tucker Dupree, American swimmer, competed in the 2012 and 2016 Paralympic games
Nyheim Hines, NFL running back; two sport athlete in football and track at NC State
James Mays, professional basketball player
Scotty McCreery, country music singer and season 10 winner of American Idol
Richard Medlin, NFL player
King Mez (Morris W. Ricks II), rapper, producer and writer
Wilmont Perry, NFL and Arena League football player
Randolph Ross, track athlete, 2020 Olympic gold medalist in the 4x400m relay
John Wall, All-Star NBA player for the Los Angeles Clippers
Pat Watkins, MLB outfielder
David West, former NBA player and two-time champion with the Golden State Warriors
Donald Williams, professional basketball player; 1993 NCAA basketball tournament Most Outstanding Player at North Carolina 
Eric Williams, former NFL safety

References

Public high schools in North Carolina
Schools in Wake County, North Carolina
Magnet schools in North Carolina
1968 establishments in North Carolina
Educational institutions established in 1968